Valentina Nikolaevna Zhukova (born 26 July 1992) is a Russian footballer who plays as a forward. She has been a member of the Russia women's national team.

International career
Zhukova capped for Russia at senior level during the 2018 Algarve Cup.

Football Career

References

1992 births
Living people
Russian women's footballers
Women's association football forwards
Russian Women's Football Championship players
Russia women's international footballers